Diego González Polanco (born 28 January 1995) is a Spanish professional footballer who plays as a centre-back for La Liga club Elche.

Club career
Born in Chiclana de la Frontera, Province of Cádiz, Andalusia, González joined Cádiz CF's youth setup in 2012, from EF Sancti Petri. After starting out as a senior with the former's reserves in Tercera División, he made his first-team debut on 11 November 2012, coming on as a late substitute in a 1–0 Segunda División B away loss against Albacete Balompié.

González had unsuccessful trials at Liverpool and A.S. Roma in 2013, being also strongly linked to Real Madrid. On 20 December 2014 he signed a new four-year deal at the Estadio Ramón de Carranza, running until 2018.

On 20 January 2015, González joined another reserve team, Club Recreativo Granada on loan until June. On 22 July, he signed a two-year contract with Sevilla Atlético for a fee of €200,000.

González first appeared with Sevilla's main squad on 2 December 2015, starting in a 3–0 away win over UD Logroñés in the round of 32 of the Copa del Rey. The following 8 May, as manager Unai Emery made changes ahead of two cup finals, he made his La Liga debut as a substitute and scored a back-heeled equaliser with his first touch in a 4–1 defeat to neighbours Granada CF, at the Ramón Sánchez Pizjuán Stadium.

On 3 August 2017, after featuring regularly with the B side in Segunda División, González signed a four-year deal with top-flight club Málaga CF. On 3 October 2020, he was one of the eight first-team players released due to a layoff.

On 9 October 2020, free agent González agreed to a two-year contract with Elche CF, newly promoted to the top tier.

Career statistics

Club

Honours
Spain U21
UEFA European Under-21 Championship runner-up: 2017

References

External links

Stats and bio at Cadistas1910  

1995 births
Living people
People from Chiclana de la Frontera
Sportspeople from the Province of Cádiz
Spanish footballers
Footballers from Andalusia
Association football defenders
La Liga players
Segunda División players
Segunda División B players
Tercera División players
Cádiz CF B players
Cádiz CF players
Club Recreativo Granada players
Sevilla Atlético players
Sevilla FC players
Málaga CF players
Elche CF players
Spain under-21 international footballers